The Atchuelinguk River (Yup'ik Ecuilnguq, literally "clear water")
Atchuelinguk is a  tributary of the Yukon River in the U.S. state of Alaska. It flows southwest from the Nulato Hills through the Yukon Delta National Wildlife Refuge to meet the larger river near Pilot Station.

See also
List of rivers of Alaska

References

Rivers of Alaska
Rivers of Kusilvak Census Area, Alaska
Tributaries of the Yukon River
Rivers of Unorganized Borough, Alaska